Grubeša Branislavljević (died 1125) was Prince and ruler of Duklja from 1118 to 1125. After the Byzantine Empire defeated King George I of Duklja in 1118, Grubeša assumed the throne as a Byzantine protégé. The Byzantines entitled Grubeša the rule in Duklja, as well as providing him with an army that he would command against George, who was backed by the Grand Principality of Serbia under the rule of the Vukanović dynasty. Grubeša reigned until his death in 1125, when he was defeated by George. He is buried at the Church of Saint George in Bar.

See also
 Vojislavljević dynasty

References

Sources 
 
 
 

1125 deaths
12th-century Serbian nobility
Rulers of Duklja
Vojislavljević dynasty
Year of birth unknown